Tom Farniok (born August 31, 1991) is an American football center who is currently a free agent. He was signed by the Minnesota Vikings as an undrafted free agent in 2015. He played college football at Iowa State.

Early years
Farniok was a three-year letterwinner at Washington High School in Sioux Falls, South Dakota. In 2008, he was named Class 11AA first-team All-State. As a sophomore, he was an honorable mention All-conference. He was named Class 11AA First-team All-State and offensive MVP of All-City Team. He was a first-team Greater Dakota All-Conference as senior and junior. As a senior, he served as team captain of Washington Warrior team that went 13-0 and claimed the Class 11AA state title (Washington's first since 1976). In addition, he was also an academic All-Conference and All-State in 2009.

Farniok also lettered in basketball and track & field at Washington HS. He had a personal-best throw of 43.73 meters (143 feet, 5 inches) in the discus as a senior. He also recorded a top-throw of 13 meters (42 feet, 8 inches) in the shot put at the Dakota Relays.

Considered as a two-star recruit by Rivals.com, Farniok chose Iowa State over offers from North Dakota, North Dakota State and South Dakota State.

Professional career

Farniok did not hear his name called during the 2015 NFL Draft, but signed with the Minnesota Vikings as an undrafted free agent shortly after the draft. He was subsequently released prior to the commencement of the 2015 season.

References

External links
 Iowa State profile

Living people
American football centers
Iowa State Cyclones football players
Minnesota Vikings players
Players of American football from South Dakota
Sportspeople from Sioux Falls, South Dakota
1991 births